A New High in Low is a double-disc album released by Pigface on August 26, 1997, featuring the work of Martin Atkins, Genesis P-Orridge, Dave Wright, and Meg Lee Chin.

Track listing

Disc 1

Disc 2

Personnel
Martin Atkins - drums, vocals (1), loops (3-4, 13-15), synths (2, 7), samples (11, 12), piano (14), bells (10), noises (1), horns (7), bass (11, 12), mellotron (11, 12), programming (2, 5, 6, 9)
Curse Mackey - vocals (1)
BobDog - sitar (2, 5)
Mary Dee Reynolds - vocals (2)
Dave Wright - didgeridoo (3), synths (3, 14), waterphone (14)
Ben Stokes - scratches (3)
Marc Heal - vocals (3)
Dirk Flanigan - vocals (3, 9) 
Alex Welz - vocals (4)
Obioma Little - vocals (5, 10-12)
Steve Crittall - guitar (6), bass (6)
Meg Lee Chin - vocals (6), guitar (6), programming (6)
Amy Larson - vocals (7)
Dana Cochrane - vocals (7)
Al Kiyzs - bass (8)
Paul Ferguson - drums (8)
Louis Svitek - guitar (8)
Jim Marcus - vocals (8)
DJ Jordan Fields - scratches (9, 11, 12)
Mark Spybey - vocals (9)
Vikki Omega Stokes - vocals (9)
Adam Yoffe - programming (10)
Mick Harris - bass (13, 15)
Genesis P-Orridge - vocals (13, 15)
Jim Sochacki - engineering (1, 2)
Jason McNinch - engineering (8)

References

1997 albums
Pigface albums
Invisible Records albums